William Lanteau (born William Lanctot) (November 17, 1922 - November 3, 1993) was an American character actor. Among his best known roles are Charlie the mail carrier in On Golden Pond and mayor Chester Wanamaker in Newhart.

Life and career 
Lanteau was born in St. Johnsbury, Vermont. During WWII he was in the Army. His first television appearance was in 1954 in an episode of Goodyear Television Playhouse. He appeared in over 80 television shows, among them The Donna Reed Show, The Ghost & Mrs. Muir, The Andy Griffith Show, Here's Lucy, Wonder Woman, No Soap, Radio, Centennial and Amen. He appeared in the first season of Barnaby Jones in an episode titled "To Denise, with Love and Murder" (April 22, 1973). He also appeared in the movies Li'l Abner (1959), The Honeymoon Machine (1961), Sex and the Single Girl (1964), Hotel (1967), From Noon till Three (1976), On Golden Pond (1981) and Cold Steel (1987).

Death
He died of complications from heart surgery on November 3, 1993, two weeks before his 71st birthday.

Filmography

References 

3. Demetria Fulton previewed William Lanteau's appearance in the first season of Barnaby Jones; episode titled, "To Denise, with Love and Murder" (April 22, 1973).

External links
 
 
 

1922 births
1993 deaths
United States Army personnel of World War II
People from St. Johnsbury, Vermont
Male actors from Vermont
20th-century American male actors